Ndiago  or N'Djiago is a town and urban commune in the Trarza Region of south-western Mauritania.

In 2000 it had a population of 8,440. It is located in the Diawling National Park.

References

Communes of Trarza Region